Dick Ferguson (March 16, 1950 in Los Angeles, California – September 26, 2010) was a driver in the CART Championship Car series.  He raced in the 1979-1985 and 1987-1988 seasons, with 26 career starts, including the 1980 Indianapolis 500.  He finished in the top ten 5 times, with a best finish of 6th position in 1981 at Michigan. He died of cancer in 2010.

Racing record

SCCA National Championship Runoffs

Complete USAC Mini-Indy Series results

External links
Driver Database Profile

1950 births
Champ Car drivers
2010 deaths
Indianapolis 500 drivers
Racing drivers from Los Angeles
SCCA National Championship Runoffs participants
SCCA Formula Super Vee drivers